Squish may refer to:

 Squish (FidoNet), a mail tossing application and mail storage format.
 Ogg Squish, an audio compression codec.
Squish (piston engine), an effect in internal combustion engines, creating additional turbulence as the piston reaches top-dead centre.
 Squish (Froglogic), a commercial computer program to test graphical user interfaces.
 Squish (animated series) A French animated series based on the graphic novel created by Jennifer Holm & Matthew Holm
 Squish, a slang for a queerplatonic crush.